Samuel Womack III (born July 7, 1999) is an American football cornerback for the San Francisco 49ers of the National Football League (NFL). He played college football at Toledo.

High school
Womack attended East English Village Preparatory Academy in Detroit, Michigan. As a senior, he gained over 1,000 receiving yards, caught 20 touchdown passes, and made 11 interceptions which earned him All-State honors.

College career
Womack was a member of the Toledo Rockets for five seasons. In 2020, he was nominated for the Burlsworth Trophy. He finished his college career with 126 tackles and 4.5 tackles for loss with 39 passes defended and five interceptions in 53 games played.

Professional career

Womack was selected in the fifth round (172nd overall) of the 2022 NFL Draft by the San Francisco 49ers.

References

External links
 San Francisco 49ers bio
Toledo Rockets bio

Living people
Players of American football from Detroit
American football cornerbacks
San Francisco 49ers players
Toledo Rockets football players
1999 births